The women's team recurve archery competition at the 2014 Asian Games in Incheon was held from 23 to 28 September at Gyeyang Asiad Archery Field.

A total of 13 teams participated in the qualification round with all 13 teams progressing to the knockout round.

Schedule
All times are Korea Standard Time (UTC+09:00)

Results

Ranking round

Knockout round

1/8 eliminations

Quarterfinals

Semifinals

Bronze medal match

Gold medal match

References

External links
Official website

Women's recurve team